Methylocapsa palsarum is a Gram-negative, aerobic, methanotrophic and non-motile bacteria from the genus of Methylocapsa which has been isolated from a palsa in Norway.

References

External links
Type strain of Methylocapsa palsarum at BacDive -  the Bacterial Diversity Metadatabase

Beijerinckiaceae
Bacteria described in 2015